The Jinbei 750 is a compact MPV produced by Jinbei from 2015. The model was also rebadged as the SWM X2 from 2019.

Overview

The Jinbei 750 debuted in April 2015 during the 2015 Shanghai Auto Show, and was launched on the China car market immediately with prices ranging from 53,800 yuan to 63,800 yuan ($8,660 – 10,270).

The Jinbei 750 is a seven-seat MPV with a 2-2-3 configuration, and is currently only available with a 1.5 liter four-cylinder petrol engine producing 112hp and 147nm of torque, mated to a five-speed manual. A 136hp 1.5 liter turbo engine was launched later.

SWM X2
The SWM X2 is a compact MPV launched in 2019 and produced by Chinese automaker SWM, and is essentially a rebadged Jinbei 750 with redesigned front grilles.

See also
Jinbei (marque)

References

External links

Jinbei official site

Minivans
Full-size vehicles
Cars introduced in 2015
Front-wheel-drive vehicles
2010s cars
750